Jodie T. Allen is an American journalist and author. She is the former Department Assistant Secretary at the United States Department of Labor and Senior Editor at Pew Research Center.

Allen is most known for her journalistic contributions toward U.S. economic reforms and policy management. With her research interests in public policy making, social security reforms, political economy, and geopolitics, she has contributed to many news outlets, including Washington Post and Slate Magazine, and authored a book chapter in the book Muslims in Western Politics.

She was the Senior Editor at Pew Research Center from 2005 to 2011.

Education and career
Allen earned a Bachelor's degree in Political Science and Economics from Vassar College. Allen started her professional career in 1997 when she joined the U.S. Department of Labor as Deputy Assistant Secretary, Policy & Research and served until 1980. From 1980 to 1996, she was affiliated with The Washington Post. In 1996, she was appointed as the Washington Editor at Slate Magazine and served there until 1999. Subsequently, she held an appointment at the U.S. News & World Report in 1999, where she worked in various capacities until the end of her tenure in 2005. Following this appointment, she worked as the Senior Editor at the Pew Research Center from 2005 to 2011.

Work 
Allen has authored numerous publications, including articles in news outlets, think tanks, and book chapters.

US economic policies and reforms
While examining the idea of Negative Income Tax (NIT), she established that NIT and the already placed welfare system could not go hand in hand since the latter provides in-kind benefits along with cash, which practically vitiates NIT's attraction. She also identified administrative flaws in the NIT, mainly focusing on the income-accounting period, and indicated the possibility of benefits denial to families in need along with potential tax evasion. Exploring the public sentiment on U.S. domestic economic policies, she highlighted a divide among U.S. citizens along the economic lines.

Focusing her research on the Inflation dynamics in the US, Allen dismissed the notion of economics influencing partisan affiliation. Her analysis of Nixon's welfare reforms substantiated the reduction of welfare benefits as a counterproductive move since it restricted benefits to certain poor factions, including orphans and the unemployed. Additionally, she proposed a Principal Earner Rule in her evaluation of President Carter's welfare reforms. She identified loopholes that could lead to systematic manipulation, preventing the needy from receiving their entitled assistance.

Global political developments
Allen has studied the Suffrage Movement extensively. She analyzed the female voter turnout post-suffrage movement and probed the potential reasons behind anti-suffragist views, ultimately determining the controlling factor as one of the primary reasons for low female voter turnaround. 

While evaluating the relationship between Europe and its Muslim population, Allen uncovered a hidden rift between natives and Muslims, primarily due to the stereotypes associated with Muslims in general. Her analysis revealed that Muslims currently residing in Europe are less likely to be interested in a clash of civilizations than those in the middle east. Following the 2005 youth riots in France, she conducted an analysis of the societal integration status of Muslims in French society. The survey investigated the self-identification trend among French Muslims, reported that the split was almost even, with 42% identifying as French citizens first and 46% identifying as Muslims first, and concluded that despite the unrest, the French model for societal integration still surpassed its European counterparts.

Personal life 
In 1960, she married Princeton alumnus lawyer George V. Allen Jr., a conservationist who served as the deputy assistant administrator in the EPA at its founding.

Selected articles
Allen, J. T. (1973). Designing income maintenance systems: The income accounting problem (Vol. 134, No. 958-959). Urban Institute.
Packer, A. H., Gordon, N. M., Allen, J. T., & Gordon, N. M. (1978). Women's and Welfare Reform. Challenge, 20(6), 45-50.
Allen, J. T. (2002). Negative income tax. The concise encyclopedia of economics.
Allen, J. T. (2006). The French-Muslim connection: Is France doing a better job of integration than its critics. Pew Research Center, 17.
Allen, J. T. (2011). Re-counting poverty.

References

External links 
 

Living people
Slate (magazine) people
The Washington Post people
American women journalists
Year of birth missing (living people)
21st-century American women